Teru "Tay" Hayashi (February 12, 1914 – December 18, 2003) was a Japanese-American cell biologist and physiologist known for his research on the biochemical mechanisms of muscle contraction.

Hayashi was born in 1914 in Atlantic City, New Jersey, where he was raised by Japanese parents. In 1938, he received a physics degree from Ursinus College in Pennsylvania, followed by a Ph.D. in biology from the University of Missouri in 1943. At the University of Missouri, he studied under the supervision of Daniel Mazia.

Hayashi joined the faculty of Columbia University in 1945, eventually becoming full professor and chairman of the biology department there. In 1967, he left Columbia to join the Illinois Institute of Technology, where he founded and subsequently chaired the biology department. He began working at the Marine Biological Laboratory (MBL) in Woods Hole, Massachusetts as an independent investigator in 1948, and later became one of its corporation members and trustees.

Hayashi was a Guggenheim Fellow in 1954 and a Humboldt Fellow in 1974. He was also a Fulbright Scholar in 1954 and 1974. He was a member of the Society of General Physiologists, the American Association for the Advancement of Science, the Biophysical Society, and the Physiological Society. In 2002, the MBL established the Tay Hayashi Lecture in Cell Physiology in his honor.

Hayashi died of esophageal cancer on December 18, 2003, at the Royal Nursing Center in Falmouth, Massachusetts.

References

1914 births
2003 deaths
American people of Japanese descent
Scientists from New Jersey
American molecular biologists
American physiologists
People from Atlantic City, New Jersey
Ursinus College alumni
University of Missouri alumni
Columbia University faculty
Fellows of the American Association for the Advancement of Science
Deaths from esophageal cancer
Deaths from cancer in Massachusetts
Illinois Institute of Technology faculty
20th-century American biologists